In mathematics, an automorphic function is a function on a space that is invariant under the action of some group, in other words a function on the quotient space.  Often the space is a complex manifold and the group is a discrete group.

Factor of automorphy
In mathematics, the notion of factor of automorphy arises for a group acting on a complex-analytic manifold. Suppose a group  acts on a complex-analytic manifold . A function  is termed an automorphic form if the following holds:

 

where  is an everywhere nonzero holomorphic function.

The factor of automorphy for the automorphic form  is the function .

Some facts about factors of automorphy:

 The factor of automorphy is a coboundary if and only if it arises from an everywhere nonzero automorphic form.
 For a given factor of automorphy, the space of automorphic forms is a vector space.
 The pointwise product of two automorphic forms is an automorphic form corresponding to the product of the corresponding factors of automorphy.

Relation between factors of automorphy and other notions:

 Let  be a lattice in a Lie group . Then, a factor of automorphy for  corresponds to a line bundle on the quotient group . Further, the automorphic forms for a given factor of automorphy correspond to sections of the corresponding line bundle.

The specific case of  a subgroup of SL(2, R), acting on the upper half-plane, is treated in the article on automorphic factors.

Examples

Kleinian group
Elliptic modular function
Modular function
Complex torus

References

Automorphic forms
Discrete groups
Types of functions
Complex manifolds